Sardath is a science fiction character appearing in American comic books published by DC Comics. Created by editor Gardner Fox and Mike Sekowsky, he first appeared in Showcase #17 (November 1958).

Publication history
Sardath was created by Gardner Fox and Mike Sekowsky, first appearing in Showcase #17. However, in the Prime Earth continuity, Sardath first appeared as part of the New 52 DC Universe in Justice League United #2 by Jeff Lemire and Mike McKone.

Fictional character biography
Sardath is the lead scientist on the technologically advanced planet Rann. The Rannians are a humanoid race who appear almost identical to humans from Earth. Sardath is known for many of his world's greatest inventions, the most important being Zeta-Beam. It was originally created as a communication device so he could contact other worlds; due to the amount of energy used, it became a teleporter. The first planet reached was Earth, where it struck one of the world's native archaeologists, Adam Strange, and then transported him across the galaxy to Rann. Sardath was shocked by this, but theorised that radiation of the beam would wear off, sending the Earthling home. The alien was shocked to find himself in Sardath's lab; he calmed down when he met Sardath's daughter, Alanna. 

The Earthling remained with Sardath and his daughter to protect the planet from extraterrestrial threats using Rann's technology. Eventually, the effects of the beam wore off, automatically returning Strange to Earth at the exact point of departure, but not before Sardath had given him a schedule of beam firings, allowing him to periodically return to the planet. Using mathematical calculations, he was able to determine the exact time and the precise locations at which the Zeta-Beams would arrive. He travels the world and intercepts them, to defend Rann and be with Alanna.

In other media

Television
 Sardath appears in the television series Batman: The Brave and the Bold episode "Mystery in Space", voiced by Richard McGonagle.
 Sardath appears in the Young Justice: Invasion episode "Earthlings", voiced by W. Morgan Sheppard. Sardath and Alanna help Adam Strange and his allies Superboy, Miss Martian, and Beast Boy in their efforts to find the Kroloteans and their Zeta Ray technology by distracting Rannian authorities and fighting the armored Kroloteans. Sardath only speaks his native Rannian, but thanks to Miss Martian's telepathic abilities they are all able to understand him.
 Sardath appears in the 2018 SyFy series Krypton, in which he works alongside Adam Strange and Alanna to make sure Krypton's history continues on track.

Film
Sardath appears in Green Lantern: Beware My Power, voiced by Simon Templeman.

References

External links
 DCDP: Sardath – DC Database Project

American comics characters
1958 comics debuts
Comics characters introduced in 1958
Adam Strange
Characters created by Gardner Fox
Characters created by Mike Sekowsky